Jared Lloyd Champion (born February 27, 1983) is the drummer for American rock band Cage the Elephant.

Early life and career 
Champion was born and raised in Bowling Green, Kentucky. In high school, Champion, with current bandmate Matt Shultz, were in a cover band called Liquid Twilight. Champion needed a singer for the cover band, so Shultz agreed to do it. It is unknown when they broke up. However, Champion and Shultz left Liquid Twilight because they wanted to write original music.

After Liquid Twilight came to an end, Champion—along with Matt and Brad Shultz—were in a band that formed in 2001 called Perfect Confusion, which also included members Thomas Bullen (lead guitar)–who later joined Bowling Green band Sleeper Agent–and David Kem (bass). Although the band broke up in 2005, the members occasionally have reunions and perform at Tidball's, a Bowling Green bar and local music venue.

Career 
After Cage the Elephant formed in 2006, Champion, along with the rest of the band, moved to the United Kingdom to gain moderate success with their self-titled debut LP, releasing in Europe on June 23, 2008, and in the United States on March 24, 2009.

Following the release of the band's second studio LP, Thank You, Happy Birthday, Champion's appendix burst during a concert while touring with Foo Fighters. Former Nirvana drummer and Foo Fighters' frontman, Dave Grohl, took Champion's place as the drummer for 3 shows during the tour while Champion was being hospitalized. In 2014, while touring to promote Cage the Elephant's third studio LP, Melophobia, Champion took family leave. Kyle Davis, drummer for Nashville band Chrome Pony, took his place during the shows Champion missed.

In March, 2014, Champion played drums on Juliette Lewis' EP, Future Deep, that was produced by bandmate Brad Shultz.

From June 5 to 8, 2017, Champion played with The 8G Band on the late-night show Late Night with Seth Meyers.

Champion is an endorser of Masters of Maple drums, using a custom made kit and Zildjian cymbals plus Promark sticks and Evans heads.

Personal life 
Champion holds two swim team records at Greenwood High School in Bowling Green; 100 butterfly and 200 individual medley.

Outside of Cage the Elephant, Champion composes instrumental and hip-hop pieces as a hobby. In late 2015 to early 2016, he scored a short film featured in the Nashville Film Festival.

In November 2014, Champion's first daughter was born. In June 2016, he proposed to his now wife, Alicia. In July 2017, Champion and Alicia got married. In January 2019, the couple welcomed their second daughter.

Champion is a keen soccer fan and an avid supporter of Arsenal F.C.

References

1983 births
21st-century American drummers
American rock drummers
Cage the Elephant members
Living people
Musicians from Bowling Green, Kentucky